Lucy Lewis may refer to:

 Lucy M. Lewis (1898–1992), Native American potter
 Lucy Jefferson Lewis (1752–1811), younger sister of U.S. President Thomas Jefferson
 Lucy Lewis, the titular character of New Zealand webseries Lucy Lewis Can't Lose